Vanessa Ruiz (born March 22, 1950) is a senior associate judge of the District of Columbia Court of Appeals.

Ruiz was born in San Juan, Puerto Rico, and graduated from Wellesley College in 1972 with a Bachelor of Arts in philosophy and in 1975 from Georgetown University Law Center with a Juris Doctor. She was appointed to the Court of Appeals by President Bill Clinton on July 12, 1994, and was confirmed by the U.S. Senate on October 7, 1994. Prior to being appointed to the Court, Ruiz was Corporation Counsel (now called Attorney General of the District of Columbia) for the District of Columbia and an attorney in private practice, primarily in the Washington, D.C., office of Fried, Frank, Harris, Shriver & Jacobson. Early in her career, Ruiz was one of the first women to argue a case before the United States Supreme Court, successfully representing a fair housing organization and its testers in Havens Realty Corp. v. Coleman, 455 U.S. 363 (1982), a seminal case setting the new standard for organizational standing in federal court.

Ruiz is a past president of the National Association of Women Judges., and from 2018 to 2020 served as the President of the International Association of Women Judges. She is also a member of the American Law Institute and serves on the board of trustees for the Carnegie Endowment for International Peace.

Ruiz was married to Eduardo Elejalde from 1972 until 1982. She went on to marry David E. Birenbaum, a retired partner of Fried Frank Harris Shriver & Jacobson and former US Ambassador to the United Nations for Management and Reform.

See also 
 List of female state attorneys general in the United States
 List of Hispanic/Latino American jurists

References

Sources 
 

1950 births
Living people
Wellesley College alumni
Georgetown University Law Center alumni
Lawyers from Washington, D.C.
American women lawyers
Hispanic and Latino American judges
Judges of the District of Columbia Court of Appeals
Puerto Rican Roman Catholics
People from San Juan, Puerto Rico
District of Columbia Attorneys General
People associated with Fried, Frank, Harris, Shriver & Jacobson
20th-century American judges
21st-century American judges
20th-century American women judges
21st-century American women judges